Eva Twedberg (earlier  Eva Pettersson; later Eva Stuart) is a former Swedish badminton player who won women's singles at numerous international championships. Noted for her stamina and swift court coverage, her peak years were the late 1960s and the early 1970s. Among other titles, she won the World Invitational Championships held in Glasgow, in 1971 in both singles and doubles, the prestigious All-England singles title in 1968 and 1971; the Danish Open in 1968, 1970, and 1972; the U.S. Open in 1972 and 1973; and the European Championships in 1970. Mrs. Stuart is the most successful player in the history of the Swedish National Badminton Championships with a combined total of 44 titles in national restricted and national open competition earned between 1960 and 1976. During the latter part of her badminton career she married the Northumberland county and England badminton internationalist Elliot Stuart and represented Northumberland.

Achievements

European Championships

International tournaments

External links

References 

Swedish female badminton players
Living people
Badminton players at the 1972 Summer Olympics
1943 births
20th-century Swedish women